Michael Umeh (born 18 September 1984) is a Nigerian-American professional basketball player who last played for ESSM Le Portel of the French LNB Pro A. He is a dual citizen of the United States and Nigeria because both of his parents immigrated from Nigeria.

Career
Umeh played high school basketball at Hightower High School in Houston. He played college basketball at the University of Nevada Las Vegas (UNLV). Umeh played professionally for the basketball team LTi Giessen 46ers. For the 2010–11 season played for CB Murcia in Spain after winning the LEB Oro play-off finals with ViveMenorca in the previous one.

With Murcia, clinched a new promotion to Liga ACB and in 2011 signed with CB Valladolid, but after some weeks, Umeh leaves the team and joins New Yorker Phantoms Braunschweig of Basketball Bundesliga.

Umeh signed with ESSM Le Portel in February 2020 and resigned with the team on May 31. On May 31, 2020, he has signed a contract extension with ESSM Le Portel for 2020–21 season.

He also plays for the Nigeria national basketball team. He represented Nigeria at the 2009 African Championship.

References

1984 births
Living people
African Games bronze medalists for Nigeria
African Games medalists in basketball
American expatriate basketball people in Germany
American expatriate basketball people in Spain
American expatriate basketball people in Italy
American expatriate basketball people in Israel
American men's basketball players
American sportspeople of Nigerian descent
Aquila Basket Trento players
Basketball Löwen Braunschweig players
Basketball players at the 2016 Summer Olympics
Basketball players from Houston
BC Avtodor Saratov players
CB Murcia players
CB Valladolid players
Competitors at the 2007 All-Africa Games
ESSM Le Portel players
Giessen 46ers players
Ironi Nahariya players
Lega Basket Serie A players
Liga ACB players
Menorca Bàsquet players
New Basket Brindisi players
Nigerian expatriate basketball people in Spain
Nigerian men's basketball players
Olympic basketball players of Nigeria
Shooting guards
UNLV Runnin' Rebels basketball players
Virtus Bologna players